Brother is a 2022 Canadian drama film, written, produced, and directed by Clement Virgo. An adaptation of David Chariandy's award-winning novel Brother, the film centres on the relationship between Francis and Michael, two Black Canadian brothers growing up in the Scarborough district of Toronto, Ontario in the early 1990s.

The film stars Aaron Pierre as Francis and Lamar Johnson as Michael, with supporting cast members including Kiana Madeira, Marsha Stephanie Blake, Lovell Adams-Gray, Maurice Dean Wint and Dwain Murphy.

The novel's optioning for film was announced in 2018, and the film went into production in fall 2021. It is the second Canadian film in as many years, following Scarborough in 2021, to be set in the Galloway Road neighbourhood of Scarborough, and Virgo's first theatrical feature film since 2007's Poor Boy's Game.

The film premiered at the 2022 Toronto International Film Festival on September 9, 2022. It was also screened as the closing film of the 2022 Calgary International Film Festival and as the opening film of the 2022 FIN Atlantic Film Festival.

Cast 
 Aaron Pierre as Francis
 Lamar Johnson as Michael
 Marsha Stephanie Blake as Ruth
 Kiana Madeira as Aisha
 Lovell Adams-Gray as Jelly

Reception

Critical response 
 

In The Globe and Mail, Barry Hertz wrote, "The spirit of what Scarborough represents – for Chariandy, and for Clement – is undoubtedly present in every lovingly composed frame of Brother." Peter Howell, film critic for The Toronto Star gave the film 3.5 out of 5 stars and added,  "A world is revealed, brilliantly." Brian Tallerico, editor for the film review website RogerEbert.com published, "There’s such gracefulness to the filmmaking here, cutting back and forth across time, building like a thriller."

Accolades 
The film was named to TIFF's annual year-end Canada's Top Ten list for 2022.

References

External links 
 
 
 

2022 films
2022 drama films
Canadian drama films
Films directed by Clement Virgo
English-language Canadian films
Films based on Canadian novels
Black Canadian films
Films shot in Toronto
Films set in Toronto
2020s English-language films
2020s Canadian films